General elections were held in Denmark on 12 December 1990. Although the election resulted in a strong gain for the Social Democratic Party, Poul Schlüter's coalition government was able to continue despite the Danish Social Liberal Party leaving. Schlüter's coalition consisted of the Conservative People's Party and Venstre. Voter turnout was 83% in Denmark proper, 54% in the Faroe Islands and 51% in Greenland.

Results

See also
List of members of the Folketing, 1990–1994

References

Elections in Denmark
Denmark
1990 elections in Denmark
December 1990 events in Europe